Allianz is a European multinational financial services company headquartered in Munich, Germany. Its core businesses are insurance and asset management.

The company is one of the world's largest insurers and financial services groups. The company is a component of the Euro Stoxx 50 stock market index.

Its asset management division, which consists of PIMCO, Allianz Global Investors and Allianz Real Estate, has €2,432 billion of assets under management (AuM), of which €1,775 billion are third-party assets (Q1 2021).

Allianz sold Dresdner Bank to Commerzbank in November 2008.

History

Foundation 

Allianz AG was founded in Berlin on 5 February 1890 by then-director of the Munich Reinsurance Company Carl von Thieme (a native of Erfurt, whose father was the director of the insurance company Thuringia) and Wilhelm von Finck (co-owner of the Merck Finck & Co. Bank). The joint company was listed in Berlin's trade register under the name Allianz Versicherungs-Aktiengesellschaft. The first Allianz products were marine and accident policies first sold only in Germany, however in 1893 Allianz opened its first international branch office in London. It distributed marine insurance coverage to German clientele looking for coverage abroad.

In 1900 the company became the first insurer to obtain a license to distribute corporate policies. In 1904 Paul Von Naher took over the sole leadership of the company, as it moved into the US and other markets. Markets entered by 1914 included the Netherlands, Italy, Belgium, France, the Scandinavian countries and the Baltic States, and Allianz had become the largest maritime insurer in Germany. The company suffered an early disaster in expansion, when the 1906 San Francisco earthquake caused the company to sustain 300,000 marks in losses. In 1905 the company acquired "Fides Insurance Company", a firm that had innovated the first form of home invasion insurance. Other places it would expand into during the 1910s and 1920s included Palestine, Cyprus, Iraq, China, the Dutch Indies (nowadays Indonesia), Ceylon (nowadays Sri Lanka), and Siam (nowadays Thailand).

20th-century developments
In 1905 the company began to offer fire insurance, and in 1911 it began to sell machinery breakdown policies. Allianz remained the only company in the world that sold machine breakdown insurance until 1924. In 1918 it began to offer automobile insurance as well. In 1921 Von Naher died and was succeeded by Kurt Schmitt. The company would begin to offer life insurance as of 1922, becoming Europe's largest offerer of the policies by the end of the 1920s.

In 1927 Allianz merged with Stuttgarter Verein Versicherung AG and two years later acquired the insurance businesses of Favag, a large German insurer that declared bankruptcy due to the onset of the Great Depression. Expansion of the company then slowed until 1938 at which point it employed more than 24,000 people. Christian Stadler wrote of the history of Allianz that it "shows how important it is to diversify into related areas to hedge against the risk of fundamental changes in markets and economies".

Allianz was a major supporter of the Nazi movement, Hitler's first cabinet included the head of Allianz as a cabinet member. On June 30, 1933, Kurt Schmitt, Allianz Director-General, was appointed Economics Ministers for the Third Reich under Adolf Hitler and became SS Honorary Member. From 1933 to 1945, Allianz insured sub-organizations of the NSDAP and opened up new areas of business as the German Reich expanded. Among other things, the customer base was expanded through the takeover of Jewish insurance houses. Allianz profited directly from deportations. From 1940 onwards, Allianz insured SS armaments factories, prisoners' barracks, material stores and vehicle fleets in concentration camps, including Auschwitz, Buchenwald and Dachau. Allianz employees regularly inspected concentration camps.

During World War II the Berlin headquarters of Allianz were destroyed by Allied bombing runs. Following the end of the war in 1945, Hans Heß became head of the company, and Allianz shifted its headquarters to Munich in 1949 due to the split between East and West Germany. Heß only held the position until 1948, when he was replaced by Hans Goudefroy. After World War II, global business activities were gradually resumed. Allianz opened an office in Paris in 1959, and started repurchasing stakes in former subsidiaries in Italy and Austria. In 1971 Wolfgang Schieren became the head of the company.

These expansions were followed in the 1970s by the establishment of business in the United Kingdom, the Netherlands, Spain, Brazil and the United States. In 1986, Allianz acquired Cornhill Insurance PLC, London, and the purchase of a stake in Riunione Adriatica di Sicurità (RAS), Milan, strengthened its presence in Western and Southern Europe in the 1980s.

In 1990, Allianz started an expansion into eight Eastern European countries with establishing a presence in Hungary. In the same decade, Allianz also acquired Fireman's Fund, an insurer in the United States, which was followed by the purchase of Assurances Générales de France (AGF), Paris. These acquisitions were followed by the expansion into Asia with several joint ventures and acquisitions in China and South Korea and the acquisition of Australia's Manufacturers Mutual Insurance. Around this time Allianz expanded its asset management business as well by purchasing for example asset management companies in California.

In 1999, Allianz purchased investment management firm PIMCO.

21st-century developments

In April 2001, Allianz agreed to acquire the 80 per cent of Dresdner Bank that it did not already own for US$20 billion. As part of the transaction, Allianz agreed to sell its 13.5 per cent stake in HypoVereinsbank to Munich Re, and to acquire Munich Re's 40 per cent stake in Allianz Leben. Following completion of the acquisition, Allianz and Dresdner Bank combined their asset management activities by forming Allianz Global Investors. In 2002, Michael Diekmann succeeded Henning Schulte-Noelle as CEO of Allianz AG. In June 2006, Allianz announced the layoff of 7,280 employees, about 4 percent of its worldwide work force at the time, as part of a restructuring program aimed at raising profitability ("Allianz Sustainability P&C and Life"). The reductions comprised 5,000 staff at Allianz insurance operations and 2,480 at Dresdner Bank. In the same month, Allianz announced that its Dresdner Kleinwort Wasserstein investment banking operation would be renamed as simply Dresdner Kleinwort.

In September 2005, Allianz announced that it would convert its holding company into a Societas Europaea (SE; Latin: European Company), becoming one of the first major companies to do so. The conversion was made in conjunction with Allianz's acquisition of 100 per cent control of its principal Italian subsidiary Riunione Adriatica di Sicurtà (RAS) for around US$7 billion. The conversion to an SE was completed on 13 October 2006. The Allianz Group also simplified its brand strategy from 2006 and their previous emblem was replaced by the current combination mark. By 2008 the company was Europe's largest insurer.

In 2007 it was a founder member of the Hedge Fund Standards Board which sets a voluntary code of standards of best practice endorsed by its members.

On 31 August 2008, it was announced that Allianz had agreed to sell 60.2 per cent of Dresdner Bank to Commerzbank for €9.8 billion (US$14.4 billion), with an agreement that Commerzbank would acquire the remainder of Dresdner Bank by the end of 2009. After renegotiations, it was announced in November 2008 that Commerzbank would acquire the 100% ownership of Dresdner Bank earlier (12 January 2009). The sale price was lowered to 5.5 billion Euro. Shortly after the transaction completed, Commerzbank was partially nationalized by the German government to save it from bankruptcy. Allianz currently retains a stake of around 14% in Commerzbank.

Allianz X founded in 2013 and headed by Nazim Cetin is Allianz Tech Investment Fund with one billion Euros in size.

In August 2015, a consortium led by Allianz acquired German motorway service station group Tank & Rast for an undisclosed sum believed to be in the region of €3.5 billion.

In April 2018, TH Real Estate and Allianz partnered to provide £100m in debt finance to developers YardNine, for the development of 80 Fenchurch Street, a 240,000 sq ft office development in London.

In October 2020, Allianz was named the world's top insurance brand by the Interbrand's Best Global Brands Ranking.

On August 1, 2021 Allianz disclosed that the United States Department of Justice had launched a probe into Allianz to determine the role that executives had played in the loss of billions of euros from Allianz Global's Structured Alpha Funds. In September 2021, the German Federal Financial Supervisory Authority launched its own probe. On September 30, 2021, it was reported that asset management chief Jacqueline Hunt would step down as part of a shake up that followed the investigations into the losses, staying on as a consultant to Bäte.

On 17 May 2022, Allianz SE has agreed to pay $6 billion in U.S fraud case due to the collapse of its Structured Alpha funds during COVID-19 pandemic.

Finances 

, Allianz is the world's largest insurance company with US$1.14 trillion in assets according to Forbes. For the fiscal year 2021, Allianz reported earnings of €7.1 billion, with an annual revenue of €148.5 billion, an increase of 5.7% over the previous fiscal cycle.

Operations
Allianz has operations in over 70 countries and has around 150,000 employees. The parent company, Allianz SE, is headquartered in Munich, Germany. Allianz has more than 100 million customers worldwide and its services include property and casualty insurance, life and health insurance and asset management. In 2013 it was number 25 on the global Forbes 2000 list.

Australia
Allianz Australia Insurance Limited began in 1914 as The Manufacturers’ Mutual Accident Insurance Association Limited (MMI). Allianz acquired majority ownership of MMI in 1998 and it became a wholly owned subsidiary of Allianz. Allianz Australia operates throughout Australia and New Zealand and through its subsidiaries offers a range of insurance and risk management products and services. Subsidiaries of Allianz Australia include Club Marine, Allianz Life and Hunter Premium Funding. In 2012, Allianz Australia announced a multi-year agreement with the SCG Trust to rename the Sydney Football Stadium to Allianz Stadium.

Belgium
Allianz operates through Allianz Belgium, previously AGF Belgium which has been re-branded to Allianz Belgium in November 2007.

In 2012, Allianz Belgium (including Luxembourg) and Allianz Netherlands were integrated to become Allianz Benelux and in August 2020, they announced the selling of its closed classical life insurance retail insurance book with

covering assets such as mortgages to Monument Re.

Bulgaria

Allianz Bank Bulgaria is a universal commercial bank having its headquarters in Sofia. It was established in 1991. On 13 October 2003 the bank received the name of its principal shareholder – Allianz Bulgaria Holding. Before that the bank was named 'Bulgaria Invest' Commercial Bank. Allianz Bank Bulgaria offers its products in more than hundred branches and offices all over the country, as well as through the broad agents' network of Allianz Bulgaria Holding. The bank possesses a full banking license for carrying out banking and financial transactions.

Canada
Allianz entered the Canadian market in the early 1990s through an acquisition of several North American insurers, namely the American Firemans Fund and the Canadian Surety. Upon the market exit the personal and commercial lines unit was sold off to the market leader ING Canada (Now Intact), and Allianz Canada continues operations in Cambridge, Ontario. Allianz Canada has also merged with TIC Travel Insurance in 2014 and has become one of the largest insurance companies in Canada as a result.

China
In January 2021, the China Banking and Insurance Regulatory Commission authorized the Allianz group to establish Allianz Insurance Asset Management, owned by Allianz China Iamc and based in Beijing. The next month, Allianz agreed with CITIC Trust the acquisition of the 49% minority stake of Allianz China Life Insurance Co, realizing the "China’s first wholly foreign-owned insurance asset management company".

Colombia
Allianz acquired in 1999 60% of the shares of Colombian insurer Colseguros, 3 years later in 2002 it increases its shareholding, becoming the sole owner of this company in Colombia. After almost 10 years in 2012 and with an evolutionary change of brand Colseguros dies as an official name and the entire operation of Colombia is consolidated under the name of Allianz.
Finland

In 2017, Allianz alongside Macquarie Group and Valtion Eläkerahasto  acquired Elenia taking ownership of Finland's second largest power distribution system operator and ninth largest district heating network.

Germany

Allianz offers a wide range of general, life and health insurance products in Germany through its Allianz Deutschland AG subsidiary. It is the market leader in both the general and life insurance markets. Allianz products are distributed principally through a network of full-time tied agents. Since September 2010 Allianz products have also been sold through Commerzbank branches.

Greece
In Greece Allianz began to work on 2 December 1985. Then was established the first Company's Office in Abelokipoi Athens. Now Allianz has almost 500 Offices in Greece and a lot of people buy the products of the company.

In February 2022, it was announced Allianz had acquired 72% of European Reliance for €207 million.

India
In India Allianz primarily operates through Bajaj Allianz Life Insurance Company & Bajaj Allianz General Insurance Company Limited, a joint venture between Allianz and Bajaj Finserv Limited. Bajaj Allianz has around 1,200 branches across India and offers services including unit-linked, traditional, health, child and pension policies.

Indonesia
Allianz started its operations in Indonesia with a representative office in 1981. In 1989, Allianz established PT Asuransi Allianz Utama Indonesia, a general insurance company. Furthermore, Allianz entered the Indonesian life insurance market by opening PT Asuransi Allianz Life Indonesia in 1996.

Ireland
Allianz plc in Ireland employs over 1,700 people. Established in 1902, Allianz plc is active in both the Republic of Ireland and Northern Ireland, providing car, home, pet, boat, and travel products, as well as SME (small to medium enterprise) products including van, business, and schools insurance. Today, Allianz in Ireland insures over half a million customers across the country through its portfolio of personal and commercial insurance products. In 1999, through their acquisition of AGF, Allianz SE acquired AGF Irish Life Holdings plc in Ireland, which at the time owned Insurance Corporation of Ireland and Church and General Insurance. Following their purchase, and despite a minority shareholding by Irish Life, both companies changed their names to Allianz plc, trading simply as Allianz. In 2017, Allianz plc became a wholly owned entity of Allianz SE.

Israel
On 9 April 2019, Allianz started cooperation with Cynet, a cybersecurity company in the field of threat detection and response to address security threats and improve its resilience.

Italy 

The Allianz Group in Italy is headed by composite insurance company Allianz SpA and it ranks second in terms of premiums written and fifth in terms of assets under management as well as fourth for financial advisors.

The Italian parent company, Allianz SpA, resulted from the integration, in October 2007, of three former insurance companies: RAS ("Riunione Adriatica di Sicurtà", Assurance Adriatic Reunion), established in Trieste in 1838 and based in Milan (part of the Allianz Group since 1987), Lloyd Adriatico, established in 1836 and based in Trieste (part of the Allianz Group since 1995) and Allianz Subalpina, established in 1928 and based in Turin (formerly a subsidiary of RAS).

Kenya
On 25 November 2016, Global insurance leader Allianz opened their new office in Kenya. Allianz Kenya's CEO, Demba Sy, officially presented Allianz's new premises, Allianz Plaza from where the company will operate. Their Services include life, health, property, accident and credit insurance for businesses and individuals. Allianz Kenya focuses on accelerating the growth of organic business while seeking to differentiate the service offering with quality service.

Malaysia
Allianz officially started in Malaysia in 2001 when it became the controlling shareholder of Allianz General Insurance Malaysia Berhad ("AGIM"). In 2007, the general insurance business of AGIM was transferred to its wholly owned subsidiary, Allianz General Insurance Company (Malaysia) Berhad ("Allianz General"). Following the completion of the transfer of general insurance business, AGIM changed its name to Allianz Malaysia Berhad ("AMB"). AMB is an investment holding company that has two wholly owned subsidiaries: Allianz Life Insurance Malaysia Berhad ("Allianz Life") and Allianz General.

Mexico
Allianz Mexico started operations in 1987.

Pakistan 
In Pakistan Allianz primarily operates through EFU Allianz Health Insurance Company Limited, a joint venture between Allianz and Eastern Federal Union.

Philippines 
In 2003, Allianz AG began its operation in the Philippines under the joint venture partnership with Pioneer Life Incorporated which lasted for five years.

Allianz returned its operations in the country in 2016 as a subsidiary group with an exclusive distribution partnership with the Philippine National Bank. They are currently operated under the name of Allianz - PNB Life Insurance Incorporated.

Portugal 
In 2018 Allianz, via Allianz Capital Partners, acquired the largest subsidy-free Solar Project in Portugal.

Russia 
Allianz started operations in Russia in 1990, with the following acquisition of one of the largest Russian insurance companies ROSNO. In 2018, after the global acquisition of Euler Hermes, Allianz presence in Russian Federation was extended by its local Credit Insurance branch - Euler Hermes Russia. In June 2022, Allianz sold a 50.1 percent stake in its Russian operations to Interholding LLC.

Slovakia

Allianz started its life and Property & Casualty (P&C) operation in Slovakia in 1993. In 2001 Allianz AG bought the majority ownership in then state-owned Slovenská poisťovňa (SP, Slovak Insurance Company). Upon the purchase SP held a market share of well over 50%. Upon the purchase the local Allianz operation was merged with SP creating a new company Allianz – Slovenská poisťovňa.

United Kingdom
Allianz acquired British insurance company Cornhill Insurance plc in 1986, subsequently renamed Allianz Cornhill Insurance plc. This then simply became Allianz Insurance plc in April 2000. Allianz purchased Premierline in 2003, previously owning a 20% stake in the business and then later purchasing the remaining 80% stake in business. Allianz Insurance plc owns Petplan UK, the UK pet insurance provider. It also owns the high-net-worth insurance broker Home and Legacy, which it purchased in 2006. Their IT captive unit in India, ACIS is located at Technopark, Trivandrum in Kerala. Allianz previously owned Kleinwort Benson, which it inherited when it acquired Dresdner Bank. The investment bank has subsequently been merged with the corporate bank of Dresdner Bank and rebranded as Dresdner Kleinwort.

In 2017, Allianz acquired a stake in the general division of Liverpool Victoria for a deal worth up to £1bn. The deal had its personal lines go to Liverpool Victoria, creating a joint venture between the two firms, with the latter's commercial lines going to Allianz.

In 2019, Allianz paid a total of £800m to purchase the remaining 51% stake in the general insurance division of Liverpool Victoria ending the joint venture between the firms as well as taking over the whole of the General Insurance of L&G.

The deal has concluded with both firms now part of the Allianz group of companies starting on 1 January 2020 with the L&G division being officially renamed Fairmead Insurance.

United States
Allianz has a presence within the United States, including Allianz Life Insurance Company of North America and Allianz Global Corporate & Specialty (which incorporates Fireman's Fund). Allianz Life Insurance Company of North America has been ranked among the 100 best companies to work for by Fortune Magazine. Allianz's investment arm includes two asset managers, Pacific Investment Management Company, commonly called PIMCO, and Allianz Global Investors, also referred to as AllianzGI or AGI.

Senior management
The Allianz board of directors is chaired by Oliver Bäte and includes Sergio Balbinot, Sirma Boshnakova, Dr. Barbara Karuth-Zelle, Klaus-Peter Röhler, Ivan de la Sota,  Giulio Terzariol, Günther Thallinger, Christopher Townsend, Renate Wagner and Dr. Andreas G. Wimmer.

CEOs to date

Sponsorships

Allianz provides naming rights for the Allianz Arena, a football stadium in the north of Munich, Germany. The two professional Munich football clubs Bayern Munich and TSV 1860 München have played their home games at Allianz Arena since the start of the 2005–06 season. TSV 1860 München have played their home games at Allianz Arena until the 2016–17 season. Other stadiums associated with Allianz include the Allianz Parque football stadium in Sao Paulo, Brazil, the Allianz Riviera football stadium in Nice, France, the Allianz Stadium football stadium in Turin, Italy, the Allianz Stadion football stadium in Vienna, Austria and Allianz Field soccer stadium (for Minnesota United in Major League Soccer) in Minnesota, United States.

Allianz had been in negotiations with the New York Jets and the Giants to buy naming rights to the New Meadowlands Stadium (now known as MetLife Stadium) in East Rutherford, New Jersey, but those talks ended in September 2008, due to opposition from Jewish groups and Holocaust survivors.

Allianz owned the Polish football team Górnik Zabrze but sold its shares in the club in April 2011. Allianz has been involved in Formula One since 2000, firstly as a sponsor of the AT&T Williams F1 Team, and since 2011 as a sponsor of the Mercedes GP Petronas team. In 2009 Allianz signed an agreement to become the Global Partner of the St. Andrews Links Trust. In early 2012, Allianz entered an agreement with the Sydney Cricket & Sports Ground Trust which oversaw the Sydney Football Stadium being renamed Allianz Stadium. 2012 also saw Allianz partner up with Saracens to be their main shirt sponsor as well as securing an £8m deal for naming rights to their new Copthall Stadium home which became Allianz Park. This deal was terminated prematurely on 25 October 2020 following the conclusion of the 2019–20 season.

The company has also been the sponsor of others sports, including the Women's British Open (golf), Allianz Open de Lyon (golf), Allianz Championship (golf), Allianz Golf Open du Grand Toulouse (golf), Allianz Suisse Open Gstaad (tennis), Allianz Cup (tennis), Allianz Championship (golf), La Liga (football), Premier League (football) and FINA Swimming World Cup (swimming), events.

In Ireland, the national Gaelic Football league is officially named the Allianz National Football League.

In Italy, the company is the title sponsor of the main basketball club of Trieste, officially known Allianz Pallacanestro Trieste.

Allianz is also the official worldwide insurance partner of the Olympic Winter Games Beijing 2022, the Olympic Games Paris 2024, the Olympic Winter Games 2026 and the Olympic Games Los Angeles 2028.

Nazi-era activities and litigation

In 1993, Henning Schulte-Noelle commissioned an archive for corporate history, becoming the first Allianz CEO to address the company's activities during the Third Reich. In 1997, Schulte-Noelle asked Gerald Feldman, a University of California-Berkeley history professor, to undertake a larger research project on Allianz's past involvement with the Third Reich. After research began, Jewish World War II survivors and their descendants took Allianz and other European insurance companies to court, accusing them of unpaid insurance policies. Allianz and four other insurers supported the creation of the International Commission on Holocaust Era Insurance Claims (ICHEIC).

Furthermore, Allianz became a founding member of the German Foundation "Remembrance, Responsibility and Future". Feldman published the comprehensive results of his research in September 2001. Based on these results Allianz established an exhibition in the Archive for Corporate History and on the Internet. The research concluded that Allianz, as an organization and through its corporate officers, voluntarily partnered with the Nazi Regime and the Third Reich, starting as early as the early 1930s and continuing all the way through to the collapse of the Third Reich.

Feldman summarized his findings stating: "It was just one more piece of business in the Third Reich, but it demonstrated that such pieces on any large scale made contact at some point with all that is represented by the name 'Auschwitz'– from slave labor to extermination – virtually inescapable."

Major General Gustav Lombard, the former commander of the Waffen-SS’ 8th SS Cavalry Division Florian Geyer, worked for Allianz in Munich after the war's end.

See also

 European Financial Services Roundtable
 The Geneva Association
 Euler Hermes - an Allianz company

References

External links

 
 
 IMAR Insurance
 Allianz Travel Insurance

 
Banks of Germany
Companies involved in the Holocaust
Financial services companies established in 1890
Companies in the Euro Stoxx 50
Companies listed on the Frankfurt Stock Exchange
German brands
Insurance companies of Germany
Investment management companies of Germany
Multinational companies headquartered in Germany
Travel insurance companies
German companies established in 1890